Michael Bellamy (born October 16, 1991) is a former American football running back. He spent time in college with Fort Valley State. He played the Clemson Tigers football team in 2011, but was ruled academically ineligible for the 2012 fall semester. He then enrolled at East Mississippi Community College, where he took part in off-season practice but was eventually dismissed for an undisclosed violation of team policy. He subsequently enrolled at Eastern Arizona College, where he played for the 2012 season, before transferring to the historically black Fort Valley State.

He attended Charlotte High School in Punta Gorda, Florida, where he was named Sporting News High School Athlete of the Year in 2010.

Professional career
On March 11, 2014 Bellamy signed a contract with the Toronto Argonauts of the Canadian Football League. He was subsequently released May 9, 2014.

References

External links
 Fort Valley State Wildcats bio
 Eastern Arizona Gila Monsters bio
 Clemson Tigers bio
 
 DyeStat profile for Mike Bellamy

1991 births
Living people
Clemson Tigers football players
American football running backs
People from DeSoto County, Florida
Players of American football from Florida
Fort Valley State Wildcats football players
Eastern Arizona Gila Monsters football players